The 2022 season of the astronomy TV show Star Gazers starring Trace Dominguez started on January 3, 2022.  Episodes of the television series are released on the show's website at the start of the month, up to a month prior to any episode's broadcast date.

The Star Gazers website lists both Trace Dominguez and Ata Sarajedini as hosts.  However, Trace Dominguez is the only one of the two who has actually appeared on screen in the Star Gazers episodes.

2022 season

References

External links 
  Star Gazer official website
 

Lists of Jack Horkheimer: Star Gazer episodes
2022 American television seasons